Kovalenkovsky is a rural locality (a settlement) in Osikovskoye Rural Settlement, Kantemirovsky  District, Voronezh Oblast, Russia. The population was 90 as of 2010.

Geography 
Kovalenkovsky is located 36 km east of Kantemirovka (the district's administrative centre) by road. Kuznetsovsky is the nearest rural locality.

References 

Rural localities in Kantemirovsky District